Domin Sport was a Polish cycling team founded in 2012.

The team was UCI Continental from 2013 through 2017, and downgraded to the status of club for the 2018 season.

Team roster

Major wins
2014
 Overall Course de la Solidarité Olympique, Kamil Zieliński
Stage 4, Kamil Zieliński
2015
Memoriał Andrzeja Trochanowskiego, Mateusz Nowak
Stage 6 Bałtyk–Karkonosze Tour, Kamil Zieliński
Stage 1 Podlasie Tour, Kamil Zieliński
2017
Kerékpárverseny, Kamil Zieliński
Stage 2 (ITT) Szlakiem Walk Majora Hubala, Kamil Zieliński
Stage 1 Tour of Małopolska, Kamil Zieliński
Stage 5 Course de Solidarność et des Champions Olympiques, Kamil Zieliński
Stage 2 Dookoła Mazowsza, Jarosław Marycz

References

UCI Continental Teams (Europe)
Cycling teams based in Poland
Cycling teams established in 2013